C/s may refer to:
Client–server model, a computer network programming model
Cycle per second, a now-obsolete unit of frequency
C/S, a Philippine television network